Govind Singh Gurjar (9 March 1932 – 6 April 2009), was a seven-time Member of the Legislative Assembly (MLA) from Nasirabad (Ajmer) and a five-time minister in the ministry of Rajasthan.

Life

Gurjar was born in Balakanangal village of Rajasthan 9 March 1932. Initially he was a leading advocate, later he entered politics. He was a close confidant of Rajesh Pilot, has represented the Nasirabad assembly constituency in Ajmer district in the Rajasthan Assembly. He fought his first election for Nasirabad Cantonment Board and held the post of chairman in the Board till 1977. While for Rajasthan Legislative Assembly, he fought his first election in 1980 and held this post till 2003. Earlier, he had served as a state minister between 1981 and 1985. He was appointed to the post of Lt. Governor of Puducherry in March 2008. As a Lt. Governor, he wanted to help the Union territory fulfill its obvious, abundant promise. He was also taught the local language Tamil by a private tutor. But he could serve for a very small period. His wife's name is Kamlesh Gurjar.

He died on 6 April 2009 in Delhi as sitting Lt. Governor of Puducherry in India.

His younger brother Ramnarayan Gurjar is sitting MLA of Nasirabad assembly constituency in Ajmer district.

References

External links
 A Sad Day for Puducherry
 Gurjar: An active politician

People from Kota district
1932 births
Lieutenant Governors of Puducherry
Rajasthani politicians
Rajasthani people
2009 deaths
Indian National Congress politicians
Indian National Congress politicians from Rajasthan